Sven Neuhaus (born 4 April 1978 in Essen) is a retired German footballer goalkeeper. He lastly played for Hamburger SV.

In summer 2014, at the age of 36, Neuhaus ended his career.

References

External links
  
 

1978 births
Living people
German footballers
Fortuna Düsseldorf players
SpVgg Greuther Fürth players
FC Augsburg players
RB Leipzig players
Hamburger SV players
Bundesliga players
2. Bundesliga players
Association football goalkeepers
Footballers from Essen